The Jenner Baronetcy, of Harley Street, Cavendish Square, in the Parish of St Marylebone and County of Middlesex, was a title in the Baronetage of the United Kingdom. It was created on 25 February 1868 for the physician William Jenner. The title became extinct on the death of the third Baronet in 1954.

Jenner baronets, of Harley Street (1868)
Sir William Jenner, 1st Baronet (1815–1898)
Sir Walter Kentish Williams Jenner, 2nd Baronet (1860–1948)
Sir Albert Victor Jenner, 3rd Baronet (1862–1954)

References

Extinct baronetcies in the Baronetage of the United Kingdom